Acanthothericles is a genus of thericleid orthopteran. It includes the following species:

 Acanthothericles bicoloripes Descamps, 1977 — Morogoro pretty grasshopper
 Acanthothericles rubriventris Descamps, 1977

Both species are found in Tanzania.

References 

Caelifera genera